Karusellmusikk is a 2001 collection of short stories by Norwegian writer Jo Nesbø.

External links
Karusellmusikk Details (In Norwegian)

2001 short story collections
Jo Nesbø
Norwegian short story collections